IdeaPlane was an enterprise social networking platform targeted at companies in heavily regulated industries such as financial services. With expertise in compliance, IdeaPlane's platform was tailored to keep companies compliant with the regulations set forth by organizations like the U.S. Financial Industry Regulatory Authority, Financial Services Authority and U.S. Securities and Exchange Commission.

In 2010, James Fabricant, one of the four founders of MySpace International, founded IdeaPlane. The company was headquartered in London and also had a presence in New York and San Francisco. It was bought by competitor Workshare in November 2012.

Products and services
IdeaPlane's enterprise social networking platform, has been developed specifically for financial institutions and other highly regulated industries. IdeaPlane's platform offers a customizable solution that works across offices in different territories, as well as facilitating a multiple audience including employees, alumni, clients, and partners. IdeaPlane's platform uses the best practices from existing social networks like Twitter and Facebook, this ensures that users are more likely to be familiar with the systems and feel comfortable about using a similar platform in the office.

IdeaPlane provides technology and enterprise social networking consultancy services, as well as delivering a software development service.

According to TechCrunch, IdeaPlane launched with two top-10 global investment banks as founding clients.

History
IdeaPlane was founded by James Fabricant. Prior to founding IdeaPlane, Fabricant was one of four founders of MySpace International, and played an integral part of its global expansion. Fabricant was Director of Business Development and Media, Europe, at MySpace.

References

External links
 

Defunct social networking services